Archduke Joseph August Viktor Klemens Maria of Austria, Prince of Hungary and Bohemia (9 August 1872 – 6 July 1962) was a Feldmarschall (field marshal) of the Austro-Hungarian Army and for a short period head of state of Hungary. He was a member of the House of Habsburg-Lorraine, the eldest son of Archduke Joseph Karl of Austria (1833–1905) and his wife Princess Clotilde of Saxe-Coburg and Gotha (1846–1927). Joseph August's grandfather had been Palatine Joseph of Hungary (1776–1847), Palatine and Viceroy of Hungary, a younger son of Emperor Leopold II.

The Archduke Joseph Diamond, a 76.02 carat colourless diamond with internal flawless clarity, is named after the Archduke and officially recorded as his property.

Early life
August was born at Alcsút, Kingdom of Hungary.  On 15 November 1893, in Munich, he married Princess Augusta Maria Louise of Bavaria (1877–1964), daughter of Prince Leopold of Bavaria (1846–1930) and his wife Archduchess Gisela of Austria (1856–1932).

Archduke Joseph August became thus from 1893 grandson-in-law to Emperor Francis Joseph. His wife's mother, Archduchess Gisela, was the eldest surviving daughter of Austrian Emperor Francis Joseph and Empress Elisabeth ("Sisi"). The young couple's children were born in their great-grandfather's lifetime.

They had six children:
Archduke Joseph Francis of Austria, born on 28 March 1895; died on 
Archduchess Gisela Auguste Anna Maria, born on 5 July 1897; died on 
Archduchess Sophie Klementine Elisabeth Klothilde Maria, born on 11 March 1899; died on 
Archduke Ladislaus Luitpold, born on 3 January 1901; died on 
Archduke Matthias Joseph Albrecht Anton Ignatius, born on 26 June 1904; died on 
Archduchess Magdalena Maria Raineria, born on 6 September 1909; died on 

Joseph August began his military career in 1890 when he was commissioned into the 1st Infantry Regiment as a Leutnant.  He was soon promoted to Oberleutnant and was transferred to 72nd Infantry Regiment in 1893.  He was transferred to Dragoon Regiment #6 in 1894 and then transferred to the 1st Honvéd Hussars by the Kaiser and promoted to the rank of Major. He took command of this regiment in 1904 and then went on to command 79th Honvéd infantry brigade in 1908 then finally the 31st infantry division at Budapest in 1911.

World War I

In 1914 he was involved in combat in the Galician theatre and took command of the VII Corps and was involved in fighting in the Carpathian Mountains, for which he was awarded – among others – the Austrian Order of Leopold and the Prussian Iron Cross. After Italy became involved in the war he was transferred to the Carinthian border and involved in fighting the Isonzo army. August remained on this front until the 9th battle of the Isonzo in 1916 a period in which once again he was highly decorated.  August was highly popular among his troops, especially those of Hungarian nationality.

In November 1916, August was put in command of the Heeresfront fighting against Russian and Romanian forces, and in 1917 was awarded the Military Order of Maria Theresa and the Pour le Mérite. In January 1918 he was put in command of the 6th Army in the Southern theatre and that July took over the South Tyrolean Army Group, which was the 10th and 11th Armies. Finally, on 26 October 1918, he was sent to the Balkan theatre to take command of the Heeresgruppe Kövess, which had lost Serbia, Albania and Montenegro by then. He was the last person to be appointed a Feldmarschall (Field Marshal) of the Austro-Hungarian Army on 24 October 1918, as an attempt by his cousin, Emperor Karl, to placate Hungarian nationalists.

Post World War I
On 27 October 1918, Emperor Karl made August the "Homo Regius" of Hungary, but August asked to be released from his oath of allegiance from the Kaiser.  He then began negotiations and appointed Graf János Hadik to build a new national government.  However the Aster Revolution broke out on 31 October 1918, deterring his plans. In November, the socialist Hungarian Democratic Republic was proclaimed, only to be replaced a few months later by the communist Hungarian Soviet Republic.  This revolution was to fail: the popular August survived unharmed, and on 7 August became head of state of Hungary once again, officially as regent (Reichsverweser) for Karl. He appointed István Friedrich as Prime Minister. When it became apparent that the Allies would not recognize a Habsburg as Hungary's head of state, the archduke was forced to resign on 23 August 1919. In 1920 the Archduke became the first knight of the Hungarian Order of Vitéz, in 1927 he became a member of the newly re-established House of Magnates. He later became an honorary member of the Hungarian Academy of Sciences and was its president from 1936-1944. He fled Hungary for the United States in 1944 but later returned to Germany.  He died in 1962 at Rain near Straubing.

Children
His eldest son Archduke Joseph Francis of Austria had predeceased him, dying in 1957.

Thus Joseph August's main heir was his eldest grandson Archduke Joseph Árpád of Austria (1933-2017), the eldest son of Joseph Francis and his wife Princess Anna of Saxony. Joseph Árpád married Princess Maria of Löwenstein-Wertheim-Rosenberg, and had children in Joseph August's lifetime. His surviving eldest son is Archduke Joseph Karl (born 1960).

Joseph August's granddaughter Archduchess Ilona of Austria (1927-2011) married George Alexander, Duke of Mecklenburg. Her son George Borwin, Duke of Mecklenburg is the current head of the House of Mecklenburg-Strelitz.

Honours
He received the following orders and decorations:

Ancestry

References 

 Cunliffe-Owen, Marguerite. Keystone of Empire: Francis Joseph of Austria. New York: Harper, 1903.
 Gerő, András. Emperor Francis Joseph: King of the Hungarians. Boulder, Colo.: Social Science Monographs, 2001.
 Palmer, Alan. Twilight of the Habsburgs: The Life and Times of Emperor Francis Joseph. New York: Weidenfeld & Nicolson, 1995.
 Van der Kiste, John. Emperor Francis Joseph: Life, Death and the Fall of the Habsburg Empire. Stroud, England: Sutton, 2005.
 Schad, Martha,Kaiserin Elisabeth und ihre Töchter. München, Langen Müller, 1998

External links

 Historical footage of Archduke Joseph August of Austria visiting troops in World War I, filmportal.de

19th-century Austrian people
20th-century Austrian people
19th-century Hungarian people
20th-century Hungarian people
Regents
Austrian princes
House of Habsburg-Lorraine
Field marshals of Austria
Austro-Hungarian Army officers
Austro-Hungarian military personnel of World War I
Hungarian people of the Hungarian–Romanian War
Hungarian-German people
Hungarian people of Austrian descent
Palatines of Hungary
Austrian people of Hungarian descent
People from Fejér County
1872 births
1962 deaths
Knights of the Golden Fleece of Austria
Commanders Cross of the Military Order of Maria Theresa
Grand Crosses of the Order of Saint Stephen of Hungary
Recipients of the Pour le Mérite (military class)
Recipients of the Iron Cross (1914), 1st class
Recipients of the Military Merit Order (Bavaria)
Recipients of the Gold Imtiyaz Medal
Recipients of the Silver Imtiyaz Medal
Bailiffs Grand Cross of Honour and Devotion of the Sovereign Military Order of Malta
Annulled Honorary Knights Grand Cross of the Royal Victorian Order
Burials at Palatinal Crypt